Ghazi Shaheed is a 1998 thriller drama film based on the disasters that befell the PNS Ghazi on Bay of Bengal. It was directed by Kazim Pasha and stars Shabbir Jan as Commander Zafar Khan and Adnan Jilani as Lieutenant-Commander Pervez Hameed. The propaganda drama film was financed and produced by the ISPR and the Navy and was filmed mostly in the Arabian Sea.

Synopsis

This film revolves around the crew of PNS Ghazi, a Pakistan Navy's Tench class submarine that intruded in India at the coast of Vishakapatnam during the Indo-Pakistani War of 1971. It ventured into Indian waters to destroy  on the shores of Visakhapatnam. 92 men who were martyred while serving their country aboard PNS Ghazi, the first Pakistani submarine and also the only one at that time with the ability to lay mines and a long range.

Cast
 Shabbir Jan as Commander Zafar Khan, Commanding Officer of the Ghazi, husband of Lala Rukh Zafar
 Mishi Khan as Lala Rukh Zafar, wife of Zafar Khan
 Mobina Dossel as Sitara Shamshad, wife of Lieutenant Commander Shamshad Ahmad
 Ayesha Khan as Phuppo  
 Adnan Jilani as Lieutenant-Commander Pervez Hameed, husband of Begum Kalsoom Pervez
 Sadia Jilani as Begum Kalsoom Pervez, wife of Lieutenant-Commander Pervez Hameed
 Nassarullah as Lieutenant-Commander Shamshad Ahmad, husband of Sitara Shamshad
 Humayun Saeed as Lieutenant Muhammad Bashir Rajput
 Ghalib Kamal as Lieutenant Nazir Ahmed Awan
 Azra Siddiq as Shehla Nazir Awan, wife of Lt Nazir Ahmed Awan
Faisal Qazi as CPO Lal Khan Satti
 Rizwan Wasti as Commodore KM Hussain 
 Ebrahim Razh as Petty Officer Emanual, leading Torpedo Officer (TPO)
 Fehmid Ahmad Khan as Admiral S.M. Nanda, Indian Navy
 Mohammad Ayub as Rear Admiral R. Krishna
 Imtiaz Taj as Commodore G M Hiranandan
 Mohammad Imdad Khan as Captain Inder Singh

See also 
 ISPR Media Productions

References

External links 
 
 

Pakistan Television Corporation original programming
Pakistan Navy in fiction
Pakistani drama television series
Films set in the 1970s
Films set in Pakistan
Films set in India
Pakistani war films
Pakistani thriller drama films
Submarine films
Inter-Services Public Relations films
Films based on Indo-Pakistani wars and conflicts
Military of Pakistan in films
Films about submarine warfare
Indian Armed Forces in fiction
Inter-Services Public Relations dramas
Inter-Services Public Relations media productions